Mark Knowles and Daniel Nestor were the defending champions but did not compete that year.

Bob Bryan and Mike Bryan won in the final 6–2, 6–3 against Juan Ignacio Chela and Nicolás Massú.

Seeds

  Bob Bryan /  Mike Bryan (champions)
  Mariano Hood /  Martín Rodríguez (first round)
  Simon Aspelin /  Massimo Bertolini (first round)
  Martín García /  Sebastián Prieto (first round)

Draw

References
 2004 Abierto Mexicano Telefonica Movistar Men's Doubles Draw

2004 Abierto Mexicano Telcel
Doubles